The Journal of Autism and Developmental Disorders is a peer-reviewed medical journal focusing on all aspects of autism spectrum disorders and related developmental disabilities. Established in 1971 under the name Journal of Autism and Childhood Schizophrenia, the journal was renamed the Journal of Autism and Developmental Disorders in 1979, and is published by Springer Science+Business Media. Authors have the option to make their articles open-access when published, while the journal works to become fully open access. The current editor-in-chief is Lynn Kern Koegel (Stanford University).

Past editors 
The following persons have been editor-in-chief of this journal:
 Leo Kanner (Johns Hopkins University School of Medicine, 1971–1974)
 Eric Schopler (University of North Carolina School of Medicine, 1974–1997)
 Michael Rutter (Institute of Psychiatry, King's College London, 1974–1994)
 Gary B. Mesibov (University of North Carolina School of Medicine, 1997–2007)
 Fred R. Volkmar (Yale University School of Medicine, 2007–2022)

See also
 List of psychiatry journals

References

Publications established in 1971
Springer Science+Business Media academic journals
Psychiatry journals
Works about autism
English-language journals
Monthly journals
Developmental psychology journals